Mario Hernán Varas Pinto (born 28 November 1951) is a Chilean former footballer who played as a full-back.

Career
A full-back who played along both sidelines, Varas played for clubs in both Chile and South Africa. A product of Universidad Católica youth system, in Chile he also played for Unión Española and Palestino. He is a well remembered player of Palestino in the 1970s, a successful stint for the club, winning the 1978 Primera División, coinciding with players such as Oscar Fabbiani and Elías Figueroa. Previously, he had won the 1973 Primera División with Unión Española, becoming one of the two players, along with Raúl Cárcamo, who was champion with both colony teams.

In South Africa, he played for Moroka Swallows, AmaZulu and Orlando Pirates between 1983 and 1989. He had came to South Africa in 1983, when he joined Moroka Swallows where he coincided with the Chilean footballers Raúl González and Eddie Campodónico, thanks of Chilean coach Mario Tuane.

Personal life
He was nicknamed Perro Varas (Dog Varas), due to his aggressiveness to mark the opponents.

Honours
Unión Española
 Primera División de Chile (1): 1973

Palestino
 Primera División de Chile (1): 1978
 Copa Chile (2): 1975, 1977

Moroka Swallows
 Mainstay Cup (1): 1983

Orlando Pirates
 Bob Save Super Bowl (1): 1988

References

External links
 
 Mario Varas at playmakerstats.com (English version of ceroacero.es)

1951 births
Living people
People from Copiapó
Chilean footballers
Chilean expatriate footballers
Club Deportivo Universidad Católica footballers
Unión Española footballers
Club Deportivo Palestino footballers
Moroka Swallows F.C. players
AmaZulu F.C. players
Orlando Pirates F.C. players
Chilean Primera División players
Chilean expatriate sportspeople in South Africa
Expatriate soccer players in South Africa
Association football defenders